Wilamowo may refer to the following places:
Wilamowo, Kuyavian-Pomeranian Voivodeship (north-central Poland)
Wilamowo, Podlaskie Voivodeship (north-east Poland)
Wilamowo, Działdowo County in Warmian-Masurian Voivodeship (north Poland)
Wilamowo, Kętrzyn County in Warmian-Masurian Voivodeship (north Poland)
Wilamowo, Ostróda County in Warmian-Masurian Voivodeship (north Poland)
Wilamowo, Szczytno County in Warmian-Masurian Voivodeship (north Poland)